Kevin S. Tenney (born October 16, 1955) is an American film director, producer and screenwriter, best known for directing horror movies such as Witchboard (1986), and Night of the Demons (1988). Night of the Demons 3, which he also wrote.

Biography
Tenney was born at the Hickam Air Force Base in Honolulu, Hawaii, where his father was stationed in the United States Air Force. He was primarily raised in Fairfield, California, where he graduated from Fairfield High School in 1973. He later studied filmmaking at the University of Southern California, but dropped out in his senior year when he began filming his feature debut, Witchboard (1987).

Filmography 
Witchboard (1986)
Night of the Demons (1988)
Witchtrap (1989)  
The Cellar (1989)
Peacemaker (1990)
Witchboard 2: The Devil's Doorway (1993)
Pinocchio's Revenge (1996)
Demolition University (1997)
Arrival II / The Second Arrival (1998)
Tick Tock (2000)
Endangered Species / Earth Alien (2003)
Brain Dead (2007)
Bigfoot (2009)

References

External links

1955 births
Living people
Film directors from California
Film directors from Hawaii
Horror film directors
People from Fairfield, California
University of Southern California alumni
Writers from Honolulu